Pavlovskoye is a rural locality (a selo) in Lipovskoye Rural Settlement of Velsky District, Arkhangelsk Oblast, Russia. The population was 9 as of 2014.

Geography 
It is located on the Puya River, 91 km north-west from Velsk.

References 

Rural localities in Velsky District